is a retired Japanese judoka.

Murata is from Ichinomiya, Aichi and moved to Moriguchi, Osaka when he was in the second grade. He belonged to Nippon Steel after graduating from Tokai University.

Murata was good at Uchimata, Seoi nage, Osotogari and Deashibarai

In 1987, he won a bronze medal at the World Championships held in Essen, Germany. He was also expected to get a medal in the Olympic Games in 1988 and 1992 but couldn't participate due to his own Chronic, Cervical disc herniation.

Murata retired in 1994. Now, he has been coaching judo at Biwako Seikei Sport College since 2007.

Achievements
1982 - Inter-highschool championships (-86 kg) 2nd
1983 - All-Japan Junior Championships (-86 kg) 1st
1984 - All-Japan Junior Championships (-86 kg) 1st
1985 - All-Japan University Championships (-86 kg) 1st
 - All-Japan Selected Championships (-86 kg) 3rd
1986 - All-Japan University Championships (-86 kg) 1st
 - Jigoro Kano Cup (-86 kg) 3rd
 - All-Japan Selected Championships (-86 kg) 2nd
1987 - World Championships (-86 kg) 3rd
 - All-Japan Selected Championships (-86 kg) 1st
 - Kodokan Cup (-86 kg) 3rd
1988 - All-Japan Businessgroup Championships (-86 kg) 2nd
1989 - Kodokan Cup (-86 kg) 1st
1990 - All-Japan Businessgroup Championships (-86 kg) 1st
1992 - All-Japan Businessgroup Championships (-86 kg) 3rd

References 

Japanese male judoka
Sportspeople from Aichi Prefecture
Tokai University alumni
1964 births
Living people
Academic staff of Biwako Seikei Sport College
20th-century Japanese people
21st-century Japanese people